Jatpura is a small village located in Dilari block in the district of Moradabad in the state of Uttar Pradesh in India.

References

Villages in Moradabad district